Mark Amofah (born 7 July 1987) is a Ghanaian-born footballer who plays as a striker.

Career 
Liberty Professionals F.C. bought Amofah from Fauzan F.C. in 2002 for an undisclosed fee. He spent the 2004 season on loan at Real Sportive. He scored 10 goals in 15 appearances to become the third highest-scoring player that year. In 2006 he joined Asante Kotoko SC. He joined Bloemfontein Celtic in 2007 and was declared surplus to the club. He joined Danish Superligaen SønderjyskE in 2009 in a two-year contract. In 2010 he joined Beitar Ramla. He returned to Ghana's premier league in 2011 with his former club Liberty Professionals. In 2012 he left Ghana and played with Phatthalung F.C. He played for Sitra Club in January 2014.

References 

1987 births
Living people
Ghanaian footballers
Ghanaian expatriate footballers
Association football forwards